= Portrait of Lotte =

Dutch viral video

Portrait of Lotte is a series of time-lapse viral videos depicting the growth of a baby girl into a pre-teen, and subsequently an adult. It was first posted by filmmaker Frans Hofmeester from Utrecht, Netherlands on 17 April 2012. The video, depicting Lotte growing into a 12-year old, gained widespread attention and the video was used on a Sprint commercial.

After the first video covered Lotte's growth from newborn to 12 years of age, Hofmeester has kept releasing videos of Lotte, such as from birth to 18 years old and, as of January 2023 from birth to 23 years of age.

Hoffmeester has also released videos of his son growing up.

== Background ==
Hoffmeester recorded 15 second videos every week of his daughter, Lotte, from a newborn to a teenager and compiled them together to make a time-lapse video. He calls it "the ultimate coming of age time-lapse". He has done several videos of her being recorded to different ages, such as 12, 14, 16, 18 and 20 years old.

Hofmeester explains, "She was changing at such a rapid pace, that I felt the need to document the way she looked, to keep my memories intact".

Commenting on the occasions he found it difficult to get the footage required, he said, "Sometimes they did not feel like it. Then I said, 'Just one minute. Tell me about your ball game, did you win?' That way I stalled them so I could complete the shot".
